ICEG may refer to:
Intracardiac electrogram
International Campaign to End Genocide, a coalition coordinated by Genocide Watch